The Cissy Houston Collection is a gospel compilation album by American gospel/soul singer Cissy Houston, released on September 20, 2005. The album's tracks were produced by Jimmy Vivino, Joel Moss, along with Cissy Houston. Houston composed all the songs except for "Amazing Grace", "Go Where I Send Thee", and "The Lord Will Make a Way Somehow", which was composed by Reverend Thomas A. Dorsey.

The compilation set is a selection of songs from her albums, Face to Face and He Leadeth Me. Both the albums earned Houston Grammy Awards for Best Traditional Gospel Album two years in a row, in 1997 and 1998.

Track listing

Personnel
Organ - Rudy Copeland	
Choir/Chorus - Emma Claire Davis
Choir/Chorus - Ray Gordon
Composer - Rev. Thomas A. Dorsey
Guitar - Jimmy Vivino	
Arranger, Piano - Donnie Harper
Composer, Engineer, Mixing, Producer - Joel "The Octopus" Moss
Arranger, Composer, Primary Artist, Producer - Cissy Houston
Choir/Chorus - Gary Houston, Anita Jackson, Arlene Robinson
Choir/Chorus - Stewart Ross, Kim Smith, Latasha Spencer, Rebecca King	
Drums - Steve Jordan
Bass - Will Lee
Mastered by - Glenn Meadows	
Organ - Leon Pendarvis
Guest Artist - T.M. Stevens

Credits
Compendia Music, Distribution
InterSound Recordings, Inc.

References

External links
Cissy Houston Bio
Cissy Houston music
Music: Cissy Houston Collection|Amazon

2005 compilation albums
Cissy Houston albums